The Hillsboro Star-Journal is a local weekly newspaper for the cities of Hillsboro, Kansas, Lehigh, Durham in the state of Kansas.  The paper publishes weekly every Wednesday.  It is one of two newspapers in the city, the other being the Hillsboro Free Press.

See also

The other newspapers in Marion County are Hillsboro Free Press, Marion County Record, Peabody Gazette-Bulletin.

References

External links

1916 History of Early Marion County Newspapers

Weekly newspapers published in the United States
Newspapers published in Kansas
Marion County, Kansas